Raivo Aeg (born on 4 July 1962 Kuressaare) is an Estonian politician and police officer. He is member of the XIV Riigikogu. Since 2014 he has belonged to the Isamaa party.

Early life 
Aeg graduated from the Tallinn Polytechnic Institute in 1985.

Career 
2008-2013 he was the head director of Estonian Internal Security Service.

Since 2014 he has been a member of the Isamaa political party.

Since 2017 he is member of Tallinn City Council.

Personal life 
Aeg has one son, and speaks Estonian, English, Finnish, and Russian.

References

1962 births
Living people
Estonian police officers
Justice ministers of Estonia
Members of the Riigikogu, 2019–2023
Isamaa politicians
21st-century Estonian politicians
Tallinn University of Technology alumni
People from Kuressaare
Members of the Riigikogu, 2015–2019